Abigaila Budac (born March 5, 1968), better known by her stage name Abigail Budak, is a Romanian-born pop music singer and songwriter from Sacramento, California. Abigail Budak has recently collaborated with Cristian Faur, a well known Romanian songwriter known for his success in the Eurovision Song Contest. Their collaboration included Abigail Budak's 2014 pop single "Take Me Higher". Abigail Budak has also collaborated with Raoul, a Romanian singer and songwriter, on the pop album "Visul Meu" (My Dream) released in 2014. Abigail Budak has also performed in concert with her close friend, Irina Loghin, a Romanian folk music superstar who has mentored and appeared on Romanian national television with Abigail numerous times during the release of her singles and album in 2014.

Career

2012-present

Discography

References

Abigail Budak Official Website

1968 births
Living people
Musicians from Sacramento, California